The 2018–19 Hamburger SV season was the 100th season in the football club's history and their first season in the 2. Bundesliga, where they were relegated from the Bundesliga the previous season after spending 55 seasons in the league. In addition to the domestic league, Hamburger SV also participated in this season's edition of the domestic cup, the DFB-Pokal. This was the 66th season for Hamburg in the Volksparkstadion, located in Hamburg, Germany. The season covers a period from 1 July 2018 to 30 June 2019.

Players

Transfers

In

Out 

Income:  €15.7M

Non-competitive

Preseason exhibitions

Mid-season exhibitions

Competitive

2. Bundesliga

League table

Results summary

Match reports

DFB-Pokal

Statistics

Appearances and goals

|-
! colspan=14 style=background:#dcdcdc; text-align:center| Goalkeepers

|-
! colspan=14 style=background:#dcdcdc; text-align:center| Defenders

|-
! colspan=14 style=background:#dcdcdc; text-align:center| Midfielders

|-
! colspan=14 style=background:#dcdcdc; text-align:center| Forwards

|-
! colspan=14 style=background:#dcdcdc; text-align:center| Players transferred out during the season

Goal scorers

Disciplinary record

Notes

References

External links 
 Hamburger SV 2018-19 Fixtures

Hamburger SV seasons
Hamburger SV